Mallet Creek is an unincorporated community in York Township, Medina County, Ohio, United States.

It was named for Dan Mallet, an early settler in the area. In the 1850s, it was an active stop on the Underground Railroad.

It is the location of York United Methodist Church, which is listed on the National Register of Historic Places.

References

Unincorporated communities in Medina County, Ohio
Unincorporated communities in Ohio
Populated places on the Underground Railroad